Matija Vuković (Platičevo, 26 July 1925 – Belgrade, 21 June 1985) was a Serbian sculptor.

Biography 

Matija Vuković was born into a poor farming family in Platičevo, on 26 July 1925. From his native village, near Ruma, after primary school, in 1937, the boy and his mother move to Belgrade, near the studios of the famous sculptor Toma Rosandić. He was fascinated by the Maestros "huge figures", then Mestrović's sculptures, and then in one of the books he got as a present book, he saw Michelangelo's Moses. All this will paved his way into the art. Vuković attended private art school of Mladen Josić in 1941 – 1942.

Immediately after the liberation of the Belgrade, in October 1944, Matija Vuković was mobilized and sent to the Syrmian Front, where, during a charge, he was wounded in the hand. He returned home as a disabled veteran and – devoted himself entirely to sculpture. Having successfully met the entrance exam, he studied at the Academy of Fine Arts and was treated in parallel. He learned from the top Yugoslav sculptor Tom Rosandić, and then attended the class of the professor Sreten Stojanović. He starts to exhibit in group exhibitions in 1949. Vuković graduated from the Academy of Fine Arts in 1952. In 1954. during special classes of prof. Ilija Kolarević he sculpts "Wounded Man" (1952–1953), which revealed his original creative style. First solo exhibition Matija Vuković had in 1954. at the Art Gallery at Kalemegdan. He has participated in numerous group exhibitions at home and abroad.

His life was hard and he was for the most part misunderstood by his surroundings and critics. He died in Belgrade on 21 June 1985, after long disease.

Style 

Matija Vuković appeared at the time of break from the aesthetics of socialist realism, in the early 1950s, with works that are significantly different from academic form. His basic forms, that retain the illusion of "realism" and a distant figurative narrative, are shaped by powerful, cruel, deformed masses that have a vibrant creative expression of the author, which became his plastic sign, and at the same time, a unique figure in the Yugoslav sculpture of the late 20th century. With his work Matija Vuković pointed to yet another possibility of modernizing new form, which will be free to develop towards plastic conceived by the author. Matija Vuković has built one of the most authentic works of contemporary Serbian and Yugoslav sculpture after 1950.

Exhibitions (solo, selection) 
1954 Art pavilion, Belgrade
1960 Club of Artists, Novi Sad; Art pavilion, Belgrade
1972 ULUS gallery, Belgrade
1979 "Dom omladine" gallery, Belgrade
1981 Yugoslav cultural center, Paris
1982 "Pinki" gallery, Zemun
1987 Matija Vuković 1925–1985, (retrospective exhibition), Museum of Contemporary Art, Belgrade

Works (selection) 
 1951 "The boy with a pitcher," Pioneer city, Belgrade
 1952 – 1953 "Wounded Man", Park in front of the Museum of Contemporary Arts, Belgrade
 1953 "As" – park in the Memorial center "Josip Broz Tito", Belgrade
 1954 "Njegoš", Aranđelovac
 1955 "Woman with Dead Child", Vrnjačka Banja
 1956 "Bison", Pioneer Town, Belgrade; in front of the Municipality of New Belgrade, Novi Beograd; Belgrade city museum, Belgrade
 1961 – 1962 "Death of a swan" – fountain, Vrnjačka Banja
 1962 "Perun" in front of the Municipality of New Belgrade, Novi Beograd
 1969 "The head of Beethoven", Doblhoff Park, Baden
 1970 "Monument to the fallen soldiers," Stubline, Obrenovac
 1977 "Monument to the first Tito's relay", Kragujevac

Recognition 
1962 Award for sculpting of III October exhibition, Belgrade
1968 Award for sculpting of XIII exhibition of Art colony Ečka, Zrenjanin
1973 "October award" of city of Belgrade for sculpting, Belgrade
1981 "4th July" award of SUBNOR of Yugoslavia fund, Belgrade
1982 "7th July" award of SR Serbia for lifework, Belgrade
A street in Belgrade is named after of sculptor Matija Vuković.

Gallery

Bibliography 

1954 Pavle Stefanović, Vajarski start Matije Vukovića, Književne novine, 17. jun, Beograd
1957 Lazar Trifunović, Savremena srpska skulptura, Izraz, knj. I, s. 280–284, Sarajevo
1959 Lazar Trifunović, Umetnost Matije Vukovića, Polja, 31. oktobar, Novi Sad
1960 Lazar Trifunović, pred. kat. samostalne izložbe, Umetnički paviljon, Beograd
1970 Lazar Trifunović, Putevi i raskršća srpske skulpture, Umetnost, br. 22, s. 5–38, Beograd
1971 Miodrag B. Protić, Dvadeseti vek – savremena umetnost, pred. kat. Umetnost na tlu Jugoslavije od praistorije do danas, Grand palais, Pariz, Skenderija, Sarajevo
1972 Đorđe Kadijević, Matija, NIN, 8. oktobar, Beograd
1973 Kosta Bogdanović, Prilog mišljenju o Matiji, Izraz, januar, knj. XXXIII, s. 71–73, Sarajevo
1979 Slobodan Ristić, Izložba Matije Vukovića, Politika, 17. januar, Beograd
1982 Miodrag B. Protić, Skulptura HH veka, izd. Umetnost na tlu Jugoslavije, s. 101, Jugoslavija, Beograd, Spektar, Zagreb, Prva književna komuna, Mostar
1987 Grupa autora, Matija Vuković 1925–1985, (kat. retrospektivne izložbe), Muzej savremene umetnosti, Beograd

Serbian sculptors
Male sculptors
1925 births
1985 deaths
20th-century sculptors
Burials at Belgrade New Cemetery
20th-century Serbian people